George Richardson (28 May 1834 – 1 May 1911) was an Australian cricketer. He played two first-class matches for New South Wales between 1859/60 and 1860/61.

See also
 List of New South Wales representative cricketers

References

External links
 

1834 births
1911 deaths
Australian cricketers
New South Wales cricketers
People from Bathurst, New South Wales
Cricketers from New South Wales